Diamanté Anthony Blackmon (born January 3, 1991), better known by his current stage name GORDO (stylized in caps) and prior names Carnage, DJ Carnage and Thirty Rack, is a Guatemalan-American record producer and disc jockey. Blackmon is known for his live performances at major music festivals such as Tomorrowland and Ultra Music Festival and his hit singles "Incredible" with Borgore and "Toca" with Timmy Trumpet and KSHMR.

Early life
Diamanté Anthony Blackmon was born on January 3, 1991, in Guatemala City. He grew up in Frederick, Maryland, United States. He attended Walkersville High School in Walkersville, Maryland. When he was 16 years old, he started playing in small clubs in his hometown of Frederick .

Career

As Carnage 
Blackmon made his debut as Carnage in 2012. Blackmon established himself as an artist in the EDM genre. Collaborations with DJs such as Borgore, KSHMR, Timmy Trumpet and Headhunterz are put to his credit.

"The Underground," released  in 2014 with Alvaro, reached the 4th spot on  Beatport’s Top 100 list.

In 2013, he met KSHMR in New York City and decided to make the single "Toca", released in June 2015 on the record label Ultra Music.

In October 2015, he released his debut album Papi Gordo, which ranked at number 184 on the Billboard 200. It includes 15 songs  such as "Touch", "Bricks", and "November Skies.”

Ibiza, Los Angeles and Tel Aviv have hosted his sets in the past.

As GORDO 
Blackmon performed his first show under the alias GORDO at Club Space in Miami, then went on to release “KTM,” his first single under the GORDO name, in February 2021. As GORDO, he performed at the Art of the Wild music festival at the Wynn hotel in Las Vegas in March 2021. He released his second single under the Gordo alias, “TARAKA,” in September 2021.

TARAKA is also the name of GORDO’s event series which has popped up in various locations including San Francisco, Miami, Tulum, Mykonos, Amsterdam, New York, Bulgaria, and Detroit. TARAKA features underground artists, extended sets and surprise guests handpicked by GORDO.

In May 2022, he retired the name Carnage after 14 years in favor of his new alias as GORDO. He made the change to reflect his transition from trap and bass to the house and techno subgenres. GORDO produced and co-composed multiple songs including the single “Sticky” on Drake’s surprise-released album Honestly, Nevermind, which was released in June 2022. In the same month, he announced his artist residency at the Destino Pacha Mykonos hotel in Agios Stefanos, Greece. He has also served as an artist-in-residence at the XS nightclub in Las Vegas. GORDO also performed the final show at Pershing Square before its closure for renovation in August 2022. He also performed at the Electric Zoo music festival in September 2022.

Personal life 
He is based in Los Angeles.

Awards and nominations

Discography

Studio albums

EPs

Charting singles

Singles

2009
 Flowin (with Foreign Beggars and MRX) (Dented Records)

2011
 Contemporary Disgust (Flowtek)
 What's This Noisj EP (Hard Kryptic)
 This Order (Fiume Beat)
 Psyche Out (with Cluster) (Fiume Beat)
 4tk (Miss You) (5th Gear)
 Frustration (5th Gear)

2012
 Marilyn (Morbit Records)
 Turn Up (with Borgore) (Buygore Records)
 Submit and be Spared EP (with Cluster)
 Bang! EP (Fool's Gold Records)
 Teke Teke (Free Download)
 Loaded (with G-Eazy) (Free Download)

2013
 Incredible (with Borgore) (Spinnin’ Records)
 Signal (with New & Used) (Spinnin’ Records)
 Michael Jordan (with Tony Junior) (Dim Mak Records)
 Mara (with Breaux) (Free Download)
 Bang! (Ultra Music)

2014
 Krakatoa (with Junkie Kid) (Musical Freedom)
 Bricks (with Migos) (Ultra Music)
 The Underground (with Alvaro) (Spinnin' Records)
 Let The Freak Out (with Erick Morillo, Mr. V and Harry Romero) (Ultra Music)

2015
 WDYW (featuring Lil Uzi Vert, ASAP Ferg and Rich The Kid) (Ultra Music)
 Toca (featuring Timmy Trumpet and KSHMR) (Ultra Music)
 I Like Tuh (featuring ILoveMakonnen) (Ultra Music)
 November Skies (with Tomas Barfod and Nina Kinert) (Ultra Musi)
 Warrior (with Dirtcaps and Jo Mersa) (Ultra Music)

2016
 Rari (featuring Lil Yachty, Famous Dex and Ugly God)
 Bimma (with Section Boyz)
 Mase In '97 (featuring Lil Yachty)
 PSY Or DIE (with Timmy Trumpet) (Spinnin' Records)

2017
 Homie (featuring Young Thug and Meek Mill)
 Time For The Techno (with VINAI)
 Chupacabra (featuring Ape Drums)
 Xan Man (as Thirty Rack)

2018
 Learn How to Watch (featuring Mac Miller and MadeinTYO)
I Shyne (with Lil Pump)
 PLUR Genocide (with Steve Aoki featuring Lockdown)
 Motorola (featuring Lil B)
 El Diablo (featuring Sludge)
2019

 Nah Nah (with Timmy Trumpet featuring Wicked Minds)
 Wait for Me (featuring G-Eazy and Wiz Khalifa)
 Blitzkrieg (featuring Nazaar)
2021

 Back in Time (with Marshmello)
 KTM (Ultra Records)
 TARAKA (Ultra Records)

Remixes
2011
 Razor Edge - Deathrow (Carnage and Cluster's Distorted Edit) (Red Fever)

2012
 Hardwell - Spaceman (Carnage Festival Trap Remix) (Revealed Recordings)

2013
 Martin Solveig and The Cataracs ft. Kyle - Hey Now (Carnage Remix) (Mixture)
 Borgore - Legend (Borgore and Carnage Remix) (Spinnin' Records)

2014
 Dimitri Vegas & Like Mike and Moguai - Mammoth (Heroes x Villains & Carnage Remix) (Spinnin' Records)

2015
 Avicii - Waiting For Love (Carnage and Headhunterz Remix) (PRMD)

References

External links

1993 births
Guatemalan musicians
American DJs
American record producers
Living people
People from Guatemala City
People from Los Angeles
Remixers